= Tempter Paul Tungwarara =

Zimbabwean entrepreneur

- Born: Harare, Zimbabwe
- Occupation: Entrepreneur
- Years active: 2004 - present
- Known for: Entrepreneurship, Presidential Investment Advisor
- Notable work: First social media application in Zimbabwe

Tempter Paul Tungwarara is a Zimbabwean entrepreneur. He is the founder and chairman of Prevail International Group of Companies, which is registered in Dubai. He is also a Presidential Investment Advisor, as well as founder of Talk and Pay (TAP), the first Zimbabwean-owned social media chat platform.

== Early life ==
Tempter Paul Tungwarara was born in Harare, Zimbabwe.

== Career ==
He is the founder and chairman of the Prevail International Group of Companies, which encompasses various enterprises, including Paulo Construction a construction firm specializing in various civil engineering projects, Prevail Shipping, providing shipping and logistics services, Prevail Mining which operates Prevail International Quarry Mine, located in the mining town of Buhera and Prevail Boreholes which spearheads the Zimbabwe Presidential Borehole Scheme, which aims to drill 35,000 boreholes across Zimbabwe to improve water access.

In 2024, following the success of the Presidential Borehole Scheme, Tungwarara was further commissioned to spearhead Presidential Internet Scheme for rural homes, Presidential Home Industries Project and Presidential Solar Scheme for at least 400 homes and feeding into the national power grid.

Tungwarara is also known for the establishment of TalkChart which then rebranded to Talk and Pay Communications and Finance in 2024, the first Zimbabwean-owned social media chat platform. Talk and Pay is designed to facilitate free global communication, allowing users to connect with friends and family as well as do transactions and flight bookings.

In recognition of his contributions to the investment landscape in Zimbabwe, Dr. Tungwarara serves as a Presidential Investment Advisor for President Emmerson Mnangagwa’s second republic. In 2022, he was awarded V.I.P membership status by the CEO Clubs Network Worldwide International Business Organisation, where he acts as an ambassador for Zimbabwe.

In 2022 he partnered Mulk Holdings for a US$500 Million Cyber City project in Zimbabwe which is owned by Dubai billionaire Shaji Ul Mulk.

== Recognition ==
In 2024, Tungwarara was awarded the Overall Top Investor in the Diaspora Award at the Africa Investment Leaders Forum and Awards.
